Haruku is an Austronesian language spoken on Haruku Island, just east of Ambon Island in eastern Indonesia, part of a dialect chain around Seram Island.

Each of the villages, Hulaliu, Pelauw, Kailolo, and Rohomoni, is said to have its own dialect.

References

Central Maluku languages
Languages of the Maluku Islands